The 6.5 Metre was a sailing event on the Sailing at the 1920 Summer Olympics program in Ostend. Four races were scheduled. 6 sailors, on 2 boats, from 2 nation entered.

Race schedule

Course area

Weather conditions

Final results 
The 1920 Olympic scoring system was used. All competitors were male.

Daily standings

Notes 
 The first race on July 7 was canceled/postponed on request of the Dutch team since the France yacht was not in time cleared by Belgium customs

Other information

Sailors
During the Sailing regattas at the 1920 Summer Olympics among others the following persons were competing in the various classes:

Further reading

References 

6.5 Metre
6.5 Metre